Phallodrilus is a genus of invertebrate in the Tubificidae family. 
It contains the following species:
 Phallodrilus macmasterae

Tubificina
Taxonomy articles created by Polbot